Keshlakchuis is a former Modoc settlement in Modoc County, California. 

It was located on the southeast side of Rhett Lake.

References

Former settlements in Modoc County, California
Former Native American populated places in California
Modoc villages
Lost Native American populated places in the United States